Samuel Leon Jones (born April 14, 1947) is an American politician who is a member of the Alabama House of Representatives representing district 99.  Jones was the first African-American mayor of Mobile, Alabama, serving from September 2005 until August 2013. He ran on a platform of safety, efficient government, historic preservation and bringing new employers to the city.

Early life and education
Jones is a graduate of Central High School and attended Florida Junior College and Jacksonville University in Jacksonville, Florida.

Career
Jones served for nine years in the U.S. Navy, where he served aboard the aircraft carrier USS Forrestal. While there, his commanding officer was John McCain, future senator from Arizona and presidential candidate.

After leaving the Navy, Jones worked as the executive director of Mobile Community Action, Inc. from 1980 until 1987.  Getting involved in politics through the Democratic Party, he was elected to four terms as a Mobile County Commissioner.

In September 2005 he ran for Mayor of Mobile and was elected. He served two four-year terms, winning re-election in 2009.  On August 27, 2013, Jones was defeated by Sandy Stimpson in the 2013 mayoral election.

On October 29, 2013, the Mobile City Council unanimously voted to pass a resolution to rename Mobile Government Plaza the Samuel L. Jones Government Plaza for his service to the city. Official renaming of the building is pending approval by the Mobile County Commission.

In 2018, Jones was elected to the Alabama House of Representatives, representing District 99.

References

Notes

External links

Living people
African-American mayors in Alabama
African-American state legislators in Alabama
County commissioners in Alabama
Jacksonville University alumni
United States Navy sailors
Mayors of Mobile, Alabama
Alabama Democrats
Military personnel from Mobile, Alabama
1947 births
21st-century American politicians
21st-century African-American politicians
20th-century African-American people
African-American United States Navy personnel